USNS Mount Baker (T-AE-34) was the seventh of eight s. She served in the United States Navy from 1972 to 1996 and with the Military Sealift Command from 1996 to 2010. She was scrapped in 2012.

History
She is the second U.S. Navy ship to bear the name, and is named for Mount Baker, a 10,781-foot volcano in the Cascade Range of Washington. Ammunition ships operated by Military Sealift Command provide logistic support to US Navy ships at sea.

USS Mount Baker (AE-34)
Mount Baker was built by Ingalls Shipbuilding, Pascagoula, Mississippi. She was commissioned 22 July 1972 as USS Mount Baker (AE-34) and entered service with the Atlantic Fleet.

In 1976, the Chief of Naval Operations authorized the testing of the LAMPS MK III System aboard her flight deck. Later that year, Mount Baker gave support to rescue operations of the Navy's nuclear-powered submersible (NR-1). In 1977, she was awarded the Battle E as the best ammunition ship in the Atlantic Fleet.

USNS Mount Baker (T-AE-34)
On 18 December 1996, Mount Baker decommissioned and was placed in service with the Military Sealift Command. The ship's designation was changed to T-AE-34. Previously, she provided ammunition onload and offload support to U.S. Navy ships operating in the Atlantic and Indian Oceans and the Mediterranean.

On 20 July 2009, the Navy announced that the ship would be inactivated on 2 August 2010. She was laid up at the Naval Inactive Ship Maintenance Facility in Philadelphia, PA, waiting to be sunk as a target, but she was apparently sold for scrapping c. June 2012 and towed to Brownsville, Texas, for dismantling, circa on 7 July 2012.

References

 

Kilauea-class ammunition ships
Ships built in Pascagoula, Mississippi
1971 ships